is a railway station in Nijō-Fukae, Itoshima, Fukuoka Prefecture, Japan. It is operated by Kyushu Railway Company (JR Kyushu).

This station is where through-service trains from the Fukuoka City Subway Kūkō Line (Airport Line) normally terminate.

Lines
JR Kyushu
Chikuhi Line

Layout
Chikuzen-Fukae Station is a ground level station with one island platform serving two tracks.

Adjacent stations

Environs
National Route 202
Itoshima City Office Nijō Branch

History
April 1, 1924 - Station is established by Kitakyushu Railroad.
October 1, 1937 - The Railroad Ministry nationalizes all railroads, this station becomes a station of the Chikuhi Line.
April 1, 1987 - Railways privatize and JR Kyushu inherits this station.
March 23, 2002 - The driving area of the Fukuoka City Subway vehicle extended to this station.

External links
 Chikuzen-Fukae Station (JR Kyushu)

References

Railway stations in Japan opened in 1924
Chikuhi Line
Railway stations in Fukuoka Prefecture
Stations of Kyushu Railway Company